The 2008 partypoker.com Las Vegas Desert Classic  was the seventh installment of the Las Vegas Desert Classic, a darts tournament organised by the Professional Darts Corporation. It was held in the evenings (GMT, morning local time/PST) between 2–6 July 2008 at Mandalay Bay, Paradise, United States.

Phil Taylor emerged as the champion, in all but one match posting above a 100 average, beating James Wade in the final. This was his fourth Desert Classic title, having bounced back from a first round defeat to Mark Dudbridge in the 2007 Las Vegas Desert Classic.

Last year's champion Raymond van Barneveld was looking to retain his title, but he was knocked out in the second round by Alan Tabern.

Prize money
A total prize fund of £126,400 was available for the tournament, unchanged from the previous year.

Qualified Players

Pre-qualified players

Qualifiers

Draw

References 

Las Vegas Desert Classic
Las Vegas Desert Classic